What Were We Fighting for? is a tribute album to the punk rock band Dead Kennedys.

Track listing
"Government Flu"- Arson Family
"Terminal Preppy"- Gob
"Your Emotions"- Electric Frankenstein
"Police Truck"- Das Klown
"Moon Over Marin"- The Dread
"Religious Vomit"- Anal Cunt
"Forward to Death"- Eyelid
"Hyperactive Child"- Visual Discrimination
"Life Sentence"- No Fraud
"When You Get Drafted"- Angry Little Man
"Jock-O-Rama"- Politikill Incorect
"California über alles"- Vitamin L
"MTV Get Off the Air"- Drain Bramaged
"Too Drunk to Fuck"- Blanks 77
"I Kill Children"- Insult
"Moral Majority"- The Missing 23rd
"Nazi Punks Fuck Off"- Final Conflict

Punk rock compilation albums
Tribute albums
Dead Kennedys tribute albums
1998 compilation albums